"You Can't Walk Away from Love" is a 2001 song by American-Cuban singer Gloria Estefan. It was released as the first single from her third compilation album, Greatest Hits Vol. II on February 10, 2001 by Epic Records. The song was written by Estefan, her husband, Emilio and produced by Estefan, Jr. and Randall Barlow. It was featured in the 2001 film Original Sin starring Angelina Jolie and Antonio Banderas. The music video for the song features Estefan singing alongside scenes of the movie. The song peaked at number seventy five on the Billboard Hot 100 chart based solely on radio airplay and also peaked at number twenty-two on the Adult Contemporary chart.

Critical reception
AllMusic editor Jose F. Promis described the song as a "dramatic, sweeping, Middle Eastern-tinged ballad" and wrote that it ranks among Estefan's best songs. Jeremy Griffin from The Ithacan noted it as "haunting", adding that it "showcases her flare for the dramatic ballad".

Formats and track listings
These are the formats and track listings of major single releases of "You Can't Walk Away from Love".

US CD Promo maxi single
 "You Can't Walk Away from Love" (AC Version)
 "You Can't Walk Away from Love" (Original Soundtrack Version Edit)

Charts

Official versions
Original versions

 Album version — 4:41
 Original Movie Version Edit — 4:14
 AC Version — 4:09

References

2000s ballads
2001 songs
2001 singles
Gloria Estefan songs
Pop ballads
Epic Records singles
Songs written by Gloria Estefan
Songs written by Emilio Estefan